Electric Blue Watermelon is the fourth studio album by American band North Mississippi Allstars. It was released on September 6, 2005, through ATO Records. Recording sessions took place at Ardent Studios and at Sam Phillips Recording Studio in Memphis, Tennessee and at Zebra Ranch in Independence, Mississippi. Production was handled by Jim Dickinson. It features contributions from Lucinda Williams, Robert Randolph, Al Kapone, Othar Turner, Jimbo Mathus, Ben Nichols, Jimmy Davis, Jim Crosthwait, Jim Spake, Steve Selvidge, Susan Marshall, Mary Lindsay Dickinson, John C. Stubblefield, R.L. Boyce, Sharde Turner, Aubrey Turner, Rodney Evans, Otha Andre Evans, Whitney Jefferson, Robert "Tex" Wrightsil, Harold "Sundance" Thomas, Roger Lewis, Kevin Harris, Efrem Towns, Terence Higgins, Julius McKee, Revert Andrews, Jamie McLean and Jim Dickinson.

The album made it to number 180 on the Billboard 200, topped the Top Blues Albums and peaked at number 8 on the Heatseekers Albums. It was also nominated for a Grammy Award for Best Contemporary Blues Album at the 48th Annual Grammy Awards, but lost to Delbert McClinton's Cost of Living.

Critical reception 

Electric Blue Watermelon was met with generally favorable reviews from music critics. At Metacritic, which assigns a normalized rating out of 100 to reviews from mainstream publications, the album received an average score of 79, based on eleven reviews.

Tom Sinclair of Entertainment Weekly found the album "it's sort of like The Allman Brothers Band jamming with the P-Funk All Stars, with LL Cool J guesting". AllMusic's Steve Leggett praised the album, saying: "what they really are is a 21st century version of a good old Southern rock band who know all too well that the hills of North Mississippi are alive with real folk music". Adrien Begrand of PopMatters said that the album "expertly combines elements of the previous three albums with a few cool new additions, making for not only the most diverse concoction of blues and rock the band has recorded to date, but also their best album so far". Veteran critic Robert Christgau said: "They've learned to lilt, or else agreed to let their daddy show them how" and selected two songs: "Hurry Up Sunrise" and "Bang Bang Lulu".

Track listing

Personnel 

 Luther Dickinson – guitar, vocals
 Cody Dickinson – drums
 Chris Crew – bass, vocals
 Jim "East Memphis Slim" Dickinson – producer, guest artist
 Pete Matthews – recording
 Stewart Whitmore – editing
 Stephen Marcussen – mastering
 Tom Foster – artwork
 Emily Philpott – design, layout
 Chris Tetzeli – management
 Coran Capshaw – management
 Lucinda Williams – guest artist
 Robert Randolph – guest artist
 Al Kapone – guest artist
 Othar Turner – guest artist
 Jimbo Mathus – guest artist
 Ben Nichols – guest artist
 Jimmy Davis – guest artist
 Jim Crosthwait – guest artist
 Jim Spake – guest artist
 Steve Selvidge – guest artist
 Susan Marshall – guest artist
 Mary Lindsay Dickinson – guest artist
 John C. Stubblefield – guest artist
 R.L. Boyce – guest artist
 Sharde Turner – guest artist
 Aubrey Turner – guest artist
 Rodney Evans – guest artist
 Otha Andre Evans – guest artist
 Whitney Jefferson – guest artist
 Robert "Tex" Wrightsil – guest artist
 Harold "Sundance" Thomas – guest artist
 Roger Lewis – guest artist
 Kevin Harris – guest artist
 Efrem Towns – guest artist
 Terence Higgins – guest artist
 Julius McKee – guest artist
 Revert Andrews – guest artist
 Jamie McLean – guest artist

Charts

References

External links 
 

2005 albums
Albums produced by Jim Dickinson
North Mississippi Allstars albums